Anogyra is a village in the Limassol District of Cyprus, located  north of Avdimou. The 20th Pastelli Festival in Anogyra took place on September 13, 2014, as announced in the 22 August issue of The Cyprus Weekly.

References

Sources
 Anogyra, Cyprus
 Welcome to our Village

Communities in Limassol District